Orari (Maori: "Ōrari") is a small town in the South Canterbury region of New Zealand's South Island, roughly midway between Ashburton to the north, and Timaru to the south it is the northernmost town of South Canterbury.

The New Zealand Ministry for Culture and Heritage gives a translation of "place of the butterfish" for Ōrarī.

The outskirts of Orari consists of mainly 2-8 hectare "lifestyle blocks", domestic land parcels where families graze farm animals including horses, sheep and cattle. Surrounding the town is pastoral farmland including sheep raised for wool and meat, small scale horse breeding, and large scale dairy farming, orchards supporting fruit and nut production, and small support businesses supporting bee wax refining, irrigation, and agricultural and farming activities.

Orari is the location of the Orari racecourse, the site of the region's annual Christmas horse racing event.

State Highway 1 and the Main South Line railway pass through the east edge of Orari, turning off State Highway 1 into Orari provides travelers easy access to the McKenzie country, Tekapo and Mt Cook.

Generally warm dry summers (typically highs are 22-32C) that can be affected by strong NW winds exceeding 100 km/hr, with cool dry winters with little snow fall and a high number of frost nights. Orari rainfall was less than 600mm (24 inches) for both 2014 and 2015.

Demographics
The settlement is part of the larger Rangitata statistical area. 

Orari had a population of 165 at the 2018 New Zealand census, a decrease of 21 people (-11.3%) since the 2013 census, and an increase of 18 people (12.2%) since the 2006 census. There were 69 households. There were 84 males and 84 females, giving a sex ratio of 1.0 males per female. The median age was 49.0 years (compared with 37.4 years nationally), with 27 people (16.4%) aged under 15 years, 18 (10.9%) aged 15 to 29, 93 (56.4%) aged 30 to 64, and 24 (14.5%) aged 65 or older.

Ethnicities were 96.4% European/Pākehā, 9.1% Māori, 1.8% Asian, and 1.8% other ethnicities (totals add to more than 100% since people could identify with multiple ethnicities).

Although some people objected to giving their religion, 60.0% had no religion, 30.9% were Christian and 1.8% had other religions.

Of those at least 15 years old, 12 (8.7%) people had a bachelor or higher degree, and 45 (32.6%) people had no formal qualifications. The median income was $29,800, compared with $31,800 nationally. The employment status of those at least 15 was that 69 (50.0%) people were employed full-time, 24 (17.4%) were part-time, and 3 (2.2%) were unemployed.

References

Populated places in Canterbury, New Zealand
Timaru District